The Surrey Iron Railway (SIR) was a horse-drawn plateway that linked Wandsworth and Croydon via Mitcham, all then in Surrey but now suburbs of south London, in England. It was established by Act of Parliament in 1801, and opened partly in 1802 and partly in 1803. It was a toll railway on which carriers used horse traction. The chief goods transported were coal, building materials, lime, manure, corn and seeds. The first  to Croydon opened on 26 July 1803, with a branch line off from Mitcham to Hackbridge.

The Croydon, Merstham and Godstone Railway was built as an extension of the railway but by a separate company.  It opened in 1805 and closed in 1838.

The Surrey Iron Railway was commercially successful only briefly, until shortly after the opening of the canal between Croydon and London in 1809.  It closed in 1846.

Origins
By the end of the eighteenth century, a number of short plateways, such as those to the Caldon Low quarries and the Little Eaton Gangway, had been built. Their purpose was to convey a mineral to a nearby canal for onward transport.

The original plan for a transport connection between Wandsworth, on the River Thames, and the industries of the Wandle Valley had been a canal scheme, put forward in 1799, but doubts about the availability of water led to the adoption of a plateway. Contrary to popular belief, it was not the world's first railway authorised by Parliament independently of a canal: that was the Middleton Railway (1758). Nor was it the first public railway or the first railway company: both of those honours go to the Lake Lock Railway near Wakefield, Yorkshire.

It received royal assent on 21 May 1801, and work commenced immediately with William Jessop as engineer, George Leather as resident engineer, and joint contractor with Benjamin Outram. The line started at a wharf on the Thames at Wandsworth, and ascended gently through Tooting and Mitcham to Pitlake Mead in Croydon. There was a branch from near the site of the Mitcham Junction to oil-cake mills at Hackbridge, and a number of spurs to mills and works.

The initial share capital was £50,000 to which a further £10,000 was added in 1805–1806.  The final cost, including the dock at Wandsworth, was between £54,700 and £60,000. The main traffic was coal, building materials, lime, manure, corn and seeds. Horses were the motive power, and passengers were never contemplated.

The railway was only briefly successful financially. It lost much traffic after the Croydon Canal opened in 1809, though the full effect was not felt until the canal acquired a rail link to the two railways in 1811.  Later it suffered from the closure of the underground stone quarries at Merstham in the 1820s. It covered its costs, but was unable to update its technology or to keep the track in good repair. It closed on 31 August 1846.

Operation

It was a public toll railway, providing a track for independent goods hauliers to use their own horses and wagons. The company did not operate its own trains. Sometimes it leased out the track and the dock, and sometimes it collected tolls and kept the line in repair itself.

It was double-track plateway with a spacing of about five feet between the centres of the stone blocks.

Route

The nine-mile route followed the shallow valley of the River Wandle, then heavily industrialised with numerous factories and mills, from the River Thames at Wandsworth southwards to Croydon, at what is now Reeves Corner. A short branch ran from Mitcham to Hackbridge and Carshalton. The railway was extended by a separate company as the Croydon, Merstham and Godstone Railway through Purley and Coulsdon to quarries near Merstham, opened in 1805 and closed in 1838.

History
The advent of faster and more powerful steam locomotives spelled the end for horse-drawn railways. In 1823, William James, a shareholder in the railway, tried to persuade George Stephenson to supply a locomotive. Stephenson realised that the cast-iron plateway could not support the weight of a locomotive and declined.

In 1844 the proprietors sold the railway to the L&SWR, which sold it to the London and Brighton Railway so that the L&BR could use the trackbed to extend from Croydon to Earlsfield and then join the L&SWR line into Nine Elms and eventually Waterloo.  However, the sale did not proceed, and on 3 August 1846 the Surrey Iron Railway obtained an Act of Parliament authorising its closure, which took place on 31 August 1846. Part of the route was used for part of the West Croydon to Wimbledon Line, part of the LB&SCR from 1856, and some of the route is in use by London Tramlink: routes 3 & 4 between Wandle Park & Waddon Marsh, and route 3 at Mitcham.

Croydon, Merstham and Godstone Railway

Before the railway was completed, it was proposed to extend it to Merstham and Godstone, and an Act for the purpose was obtained on 17 May 1803. The railway's directors were directors of the CM&GR, supplemented by Colonel Hylton Joliffe and Rev William John Joliffe, who had land and mineral interests on its route.

Work started quickly and it opened to Merstham on 24 July 1805 – it never reached Godstone. In 1809 or 1811 a short branch was built at Pitlake to the south side of the Croydon Canal basin.

See also
Llanelly and Mynydd Mawr Railway
Timeline of railway history

Notes

References

Sources

Further reading

External links
 
Surrey Iron Railway 200th: 26 July 2003 at Stephenson Locomotive Society 200th anniversary commemoration
Croydon on Line: Surrey Iron Railway

4 ft 2 in gauge railways in England
Early British railway companies
History of the London Borough of Croydon
History of the London Borough of Merton
History of Surrey
History of transport in London
History of the London Borough of Wandsworth
Horse-drawn railways
Rail transport in Surrey
Railway companies established in 1801
Railway companies disestablished in 1846
Railway lines opened in 1803
Transport in the London Borough of Croydon
Transport in the London Borough of Merton
Transport in the London Borough of Wandsworth
1801 establishments in England
British companies established in 1801
British companies disestablished in 1846